Gickelsburg is a hill in Hesse, Germany.

Hills of Hesse
Mountains and hills of the Taunus
Hochtaunuskreis
High Taunus